The 2011 Canadian Masters Curling Championships were held from March 30 to April 5 at the Assiniboine Memorial Curling Club in Winnipeg, Manitoba. In the men's final, Garry Gelowitz of British Columbia defeated John Usackis of Manitoba with a tally of 6–3, while Joyce McDougall of Manitoba defeated Karin Host of British Columbia 11–3 in the women's final.

Men

Teams

Standings

Round robin

Draw 1
Thursday, March 31, 8:30 am

Draw 2
Thursday, March 31, 12:00 pm

Draw 3
Thursday, March 31, 3:30 pm

Draw 4
Thursday, March 31, 7:00 pm

Draw 5
Friday, April 1, 8:30 am

Draw 6
Friday, April 1, 12:00 pm

Draw 7
Friday, April 1, 3:30 pm

Draw 8
Friday, April 1, 7:00 pm

Draw 9
Saturday, April 2, 8:30 am

Draw 10
Saturday, April 2, 12:00 pm

Draw 11
Saturday, April 2, 3:30 pm

Draw 12
Saturday, April 2, 7:00 pm

Ranking games
Sunday, April 3, 9:00 am

Sunday, April 3, 2:30 pm

Playoffs

1 vs. 1
Monday, April 4, 2:30 pm

2 vs, 2
Monday, April 4, 2:30 pm

Semifinal
Tuesday, April 5, 9:00 am

Final
Tuesday, April 5, 2:30 pm

Women

Teams

Standings

Round robin

Draw 1
Thursday, March 31, 8:30 am

Draw 2
Thursday, March 31, 12:00 pm

Draw 3
Thursday, March 31, 3:30 pm

Draw 4
Thursday, March 31, 7:00 pm

Draw 5
Friday, April 1, 8:30 am

Draw 6
Friday, April 1, 12:00 pm

Draw 7
Friday, April 1, 3:30 pm

Draw 8
Friday, April 1, 7:00 pm

Draw 9
Saturday, April 2, 8:30 am

Draw 10
Saturday, April 2, 12:00 pm

Draw 11
Saturday, April 2, 3:30 pm

Draw 12
Saturday, April 2, 7:00 pm

Tiebreakers
Sunday, April 3, 9:00 am

Ranking games
Sunday, April 3, 9:00 am

Sunday, April 3, 2:30 pm

Playoffs

1 vs. 1
Monday, April 4, 2:30 pm

2 vs. 2
Monday, April 4, 2:30 pm

Semifinal
Tuesday, April 5, 9:00 am

Final
Tuesday, April 5, 2:30 pm

External links
Canadian Masters @ Curl Manitoba

Assiniboine Memorial CC Homepage

Canadian Masters Curling Championships, 2011
Curling competitions in Winnipeg
2011 in Manitoba